Tropidurus sertanejos is a species of lizard of the Tropiduridae family. It is found in Brazil.

References

Tropidurus
Reptiles described in 2016
Endemic fauna of Brazil
Reptiles of Brazil